Podimattom is a small village located at Kanjirappally Taluk, Kottayam district, Kerala, India.

Location
Podimattom lies very near to Kanjirappally.

Village of Seminaries
Podimattom has various Christian religious institutions in and around this area. It can also be called a village of seminaries and nuns houses.

Education
St. Dominic's College is a famous college located in the same area. Podimattom can be called as the gateway of highranges. Hills and mountains are visible in the area.

Vegetation
The village is covered with rubber plantations and other crops. The place becomes hot in summer and receives a good rainfall throughout the year.

Climate
Winter is really chilled in the locality.

References

Villages in Kottayam district